4G eLTE is technology based on the LTE standard, the lower case e referring to a  Huawei proprietary derivative of the LTE standard (referred to as "enhanced LTE") that is intended to provide wireless broadband data access with peak downlink levels of 50Mbit/s and 20Mbit/s uplink per site in 5 MHz 10 MHz and 15 MHz frequencies.

Trunking system
Trunked communication differs from the static 'honeycomb' structure characteristic of cell or mobile (typically phone) data networks in that users share a group of radio channels which are balanced dynamically. The intention is to provide a more responsive service that combines group user sharing forward channels, half-duplex, push to talk, private voice call and conference voice calls.

Flexible Network Deployment
Fully scalable the core network system is capable to support up to 500 base stations, 100,000 users, 2000 trunking groups, which satisfies the needs of statewide or nationwide network deployment.

Voice transmission with an improved User Experience
The eLTE commercial network is designed to facilitate a high volume of data transmission, while voice service 'piggybacks' in the form of VOIP. Supported protocols include 'peer to peer voice calls; short messaging; multimedia messaging; Video; push-to-talk. Call setup times of 300ms and concurrent group calls of up to 160 calls per cell are claimed.

Video enhanced Dispatch, Surveillance, Command and Control
Using a wireless broadband trunking system eLTE claims to offer real-time 720p high definition video streaming from handsets and fixed CCTV systems cameras (the output of which can be streamed to other handsets or portable devices, and if required projected) enhancing live situational awareness as well as providing (emergency and similar front-line service) voice dispatch, data access, SMS, MMS, and positioning, in effect providing a versatile portable communication network that can supplement or replace fixed or traditional cell-type mobile infrastructure.

Broadband 4G Handset
The eLTE handset features IP-67 level protection (total immersion level for 90 minutes, vibration resistant, resistant to UV and visible light) and features noise reduction systems to provide enhanced voice communication.

Madagascar Police (Sub Sahara region) deployment
Following the political crisis in 2009 with impact on national security, international reputation and decreasing foreign aid the Republic of Madagascar, and the country's international reputation was affected by a rapid decrease in foreign support and contributions former Minister of Interior Security Honorable Arsene Rakotondrazaka opened negotiations to obtain a 4G eLTE platform.

After the Presidential election in 2013, the new government, under the regime of elected President Hery Rajaonarimampianina, on 2 July 2014 Huawei Technologies became the first company to deploy 4G eLTE telecommunication system in the Sub-Saharan Africa region for the Ministry of Public Security (Poland being the first nation to do so in Europe.).

The resulting system is independent of all other local telecommunications operators networks, ensures a private and secure communication channel for the Madagascar National Police.

See also
 Huawei
 Time Division Long-Term Evolution
 Emergency operations center
 High Speed Packet Access and HSPA+
 Huawei SingleRAN
 Huawei Symantec – Joint venture between Huawei and Symantec

References

External links
Is Huawei Honor Play Waterproof?

Year of introduction missing
Huawei products
Information and communication technologies for development